Finland was represented by Katri Helena, with the song "Katson sineen taivaan", at the 1979 Eurovision Song Contest, which took place on 31 March in Jerusalem. "Katson sineen taivaan" was chosen as the Finnish entry at the national final organised by broadcaster Yle and held on 10 February. This was the first of Katri Helena's two Eurovision appearances for Finland, after she had finished runner-up in three previous national finals (1969, 1972 and 1978).

Before Eurovision

National final 
The final was held at the Kulttuuritalo in Helsinki, hosted by Marjatta Leppänen. Six songs took part, with the winner chosen by a 30-member jury containing a mix of music industry professionals and TV viewers.

Other participants included Finnish Eurovision representatives Markku Aro (1971) and Kirka (1984).

At Eurovision 
On the night of the final Katri Helena performed 5th in the running order, following Ireland and preceding Monaco. At the close of voting "Katson sineen taivaan" had picked up 38 points, placing Finland 14th of the 19 entries. The Finnish jury awarded its 12 points to contest winners Israel.

Voting

References

External links
 Full national final on Yle Elävä Arkisto

1979
Countries in the Eurovision Song Contest 1979
Eurovision
Eurovision